A field desk is a portable desk which is meant to be used in rear areas near a battlefield and moved around rather frequently in difficult conditions.  It is in contrast to the campaign desk, which is usually heavier and meant for areas further in the rear.

The field desk is both an antique and a modern desk form.  The antique form is usually made of fine woods and brass fittings.  The smaller versions can often be confused with the civilian writing slope.  This is quite understandable, because during the 18th and 19th centuries they were often used interchangeably.  There is a wide variety of antique field desks, ranging from small suitcase-sized ones to fairly big chests, like the one general Thomas J. "Stonewall" Jackson used during the American Civil War in the United States.  Until recently, General Jackson's desk was exhibited in the museum of the Virginia Military Institute (VMI).  At one point, VMI gave a licence to a furniture manufacturer to produce copies of the desk, available on the web. 

The field desk was a civil war officers "office in a box." This portable, upright desk has a drop-down front used for a writing surface.

The most common modern field desk is made of resistant plastic composites and steel or aluminium.  It is built to NATO standards or to the standards of national armies.  There are several variants, but the most common one is a nearly cubic chest whose lid is removed to expose internal drawers and then reattached on the side to serve as a desktop.

See also
List of desk forms and types
Campaign furniture

Desks
Portable furniture